Rio Brazos or Arms River, may refer to:

Rio Brazos (New Mexico), a tributary of the Rio Chama in New Mexico
Brazos River, a river of Texas and New Mexico flowing into the Gulf of Mexico
 Rivers Arms, the second studio album by post-rock band Balmorhea, released by Western Vinyl on January 1, 2008. 
 Rock River Arms, a manufacturing company based in Colona, Illinois